Race with the Devil Live (Receiver Records RRCD 254) is the third live album by British heavy metal band, Girlschool, released in 1998. It is the recording of a concert held in Tokyo, during the 1982 Japanese tour. Enid Williams would leave the band soon thereafter.

The album was released again in 2008 with a different cover by Phantom Records.

Track listing

Credits 
 Kim McAuliffe – rhythm guitar, vocals
 Kelly Johnson – lead guitar, vocals
 Enid Williams – bass, vocals
 Denise Dufort – drums

References

Girlschool live albums
1998 live albums